Grevillea hookeriana, commonly known as red toothbrushes or Hooker's grevillea, is a species of flowering plant in the family Proteaceae and is endemic to the south-west of Western Australia. It is a spreading to erect shrub, usually with linear leaves or deeply divided leaves with linear lobes, and toothbrush-shaped groups of red, black or yellowish green flowers, the style maroon to black.

Description
The linear leaves or lobes are sharply-pointed, the edges rolled under obscuring most of the lower surface.

Taxonomy
Grevillea hookeriana was first formally described in 1845 by Carl Meissner in Johann Georg Christian Lehmann's Plantae Preissianae from specimens collected by James Drummond near the Swan River. The specific epithet (hookeriana) honours William Jackson Hooker, and probably also his son Joseph Dalton Hooker.
 
In 2000, Robert Owen Makinson described three subspecies of G. hookeriana in the Flora of Australia and the names are accepted by the Australian Plant Census:
Grevillea hookeriana subsp. apiciloba (F.Muell.)
Grevillea hookeriana subsp. digitata (F.Muell.)

Subspecies hookeriana is variable, and four forms can be distinguished, with frequent intermediates.

Distribution and habitat
Hooker's grevillea is widespread in the south-west of Western Australia, where it grows in heath or shrubland, mainly between Three Springs, Mount Churchman (near Karroun Hill Nature Reserve), Coolgardie and Katanning. Subspecies apiciloba is mostly found in the centre of the species' range, subsp. digitata in the north-west of the species' range and subsp. hookeriana in the area between Coorow, Katanning, Newdegate and Merredin.

Conservation status
Grevillea hookeriana and all three subspecies are listed as "not threatened" by the Government of Western Australia Department of Biodiversity, Conservation and Attractions.

Use in horticulture
A cultivar known as  G.'Red Hooks' (often erroneously referred to as G. hookeriana or G. hookerana) has been in cultivation for many years. It is a hybrid of G. hookeriana and [[Grevillea tetragonoloba|G. tetragonoloba]]. G. hookeriana'' is comparatively rare in cultivation, and less vigorous than the cultivar. It is best suited to a climate where the summers are dry.
It requires good drainage and prefers a sunny or partially shaded position and has moderate frost resistance. Propagation is from semi-mature cuttings or seed.

See also
 List of Grevillea species

References

hookeriana
Endemic flora of Western Australia
Eudicots of Western Australia
Proteales of Australia
Taxa named by Carl Meissner
Plants described in 1845